Chadong may refer to:

 Chadong language, a language of China
 Chadong Township, a subdivision of Lingui District, China
 Chadong, Manipur, a village in India